Graham Howard Shepard (1907–20 September 1943) was an English illustrator and cartoonist.

He was the son of Ernest H. Shepard, the illustrator of Winnie-the-Pooh and The Wind in the Willows. He was educated at Marlborough College and Lincoln College, Oxford. At Marlborough he was a member of the college's secret 'Society of Amici' where he found himself a contemporary of John Betjeman and Anthony Blunt, and a close friend of Louis MacNeice. MacNeice's "He had a date" (1943) is loosely based on the life and death of Shepard.

At Oxford he was also a contemporary and friend of MacNeice and Osbert Lancaster.

Following in his father's footsteps, he became an illustrator and cartoonist, working for the Illustrated London News.

Shepard served in the RNVR during World War II. Lieutenant Shepard was lost along with all but one crew member when their ship, HMS Polyanthus, was sunk by the German submarine U-952 in the mid-Atlantic on 21 September 1943. He was survived by his wife, Ann Faith Shepard, and his young daughter, Minette.

Shepard's younger sister, Mary Shepard, also became an illustrator, and is best known for her illustrations of P. L. Travers' Mary Poppins.

References

1907 births
1943 deaths
People educated at Marlborough College
Alumni of Lincoln College, Oxford
English illustrators
English cartoonists
Royal Naval Volunteer Reserve personnel of World War II
Royal Navy personnel killed in World War II
Royal Navy officers of World War II